Carme Laura Gil i Miró (born 1935 in Benissanet, Tarragona) is a Spanish professor and politician. She was Catalonia's Minister of Education from 1999 to 2003. She has degrees in Classical Philology and Pedagogy and she is also a University professor.

During the 1981–1994 period, she served as General Director of Batxillerat, Teachers and Education Centers as well as Scholarship Planning in the government of Catalonia. Between 1994 and 1996, she set up the Museum of the History of Catalonia (Museu d'Història de Catalunya).

In 1996, she was elected as deputy in the Congress for Barcelona. She is nowadays  a member of the National Board of CDC.

References

1935 births
Living people
People from Ribera d'Ebre
Convergence and Union politicians
Members of the Parliament of Catalonia
Education ministers of Catalonia
Members of the 6th Congress of Deputies (Spain)